The Battle of Villarrobledo was a battle of the First Carlist War, occurring on September 20, 1836, south of Villarrobledo at a campground called Vega de San Cristóbal, which lies near a hermitage of the same name.  However, there were also casualties reported in Villarrobledo proper. The battle was a major defeat for the Carlist general Miguel Gómez Damas, and his forces suffered large casualties, as well as the loss of large amounts of munitions. For his victory, Isidro de Alaix Fábregas was given the title of Viscount of Villarrobledo (Vizconde de Villarrobledo) and was awarded the Laureate Cross of Saint Ferdinand (Cruz Laureada de San Fernando).

Order of Battle

Liberals 
3rd Division: Gen. Alaix
- I and II bat. Principe
- I and II bat. Cordova
- I and II bat. Almansa
- 4 Guides coys.
Cavalry: D. Diego de Leon
- Princess Hussars (150 troopers)
- 1st and 5th Light Cavalry (200 troopers)
Total: 4,000 infantry and 350 cavalry

Carlists 
Gen. Goméz: 5 battalions
5 squadrons

Aragón Division: Cabrera

Aragonese Brigade: D. José Marín, "el Serrador"
- 3 Battalions
Valencian Brigade: D. Joaquín Quilez
- 2 Battalions
Cavalry:
- 580 troopers (6 squadrons)

References 

Villarrobledo, Battle of
Villarrobledo
1836 in Spain
Conflicts in 1836
September 1836 events
History of the province of Albacete
Villarrobledo